David A. Katz (November 1, 1933 – July 26, 2016) was a United States district judge of the United States District Court for the Northern District of Ohio.

Education and career

Born in Toledo, Ohio in 1933, Katz received a Bachelor of Science degree from Ohio State University in 1955, and a Juris Doctor from Ohio State University College of Law in 1957. He was in private practice in Toledo from 1957 to 1994, focusing on corporate law.

Federal judicial service

On August 12, 1994, Katz was nominated by President Bill Clinton to a seat on the United States District Court for the Northern District of Ohio vacated by Alvin Krenzler. Katz was confirmed by the United States Senate on October 7, 1994, and received his commission on October 11, 1994. He assumed senior status on January 1, 2005. Katz died on July 26, 2016.

See also
 List of Jewish American jurists

References

Sources

1933 births
2016 deaths
Judges of the United States District Court for the Northern District of Ohio
United States district court judges appointed by Bill Clinton
Ohio State University alumni
Ohio State University Moritz College of Law alumni
Lawyers from Toledo, Ohio
20th-century American judges
21st-century American judges